Henry Metcalfe may refer to:

 Henry Metcalfe (military officer) (1847–1927), American Army ordnance officer, inventor and early organizational theorist
 Henry B. Metcalfe (1805–1881), U.S. Representative from New York
 Henry James Metcalfe (1835–1906), bandmaster, composer and publisher of music

See also
 James Henry Metcalfe (1848–1925), Ontario businessman and political figure
 Henry Metcalf (disambiguation)